The 1982 AIAW National Division I Basketball Championship was held on March 21–28, 1982.  Sixteen teams participated, and Rutgers University was crowned champion of the tournament.  The host site for the Final Four was Villanova University in Philadelphia.

This was the first season the NCAA sponsored a women's basketball tournament, and the two tournaments were held at the same time.  Many schools, including defending champion Louisiana Tech, chose to participate in the NCAA tournament rather than in the AIAW tournament.  Only three top 20 teams appeared in the AIAW tournament: Texas, Rutgers and Villanova.  Sports Illustrated wrote at the time: "With the NCAA staging women's championships this year for the first time, the AIAW, the 11-year-old organization that put women's college sports on the map, finds itself barely clinging to life.  So many of its members have fled to the NCAA that the AIAW's only realistic hope for survival is its pending antitrust suit against the NCAA in U.S. District Court in Washington, D.C."  This proved to be the final AIAW basketball tournament.

Opening rounds

East Regional

Mideast Regional

Midwest Regional

West Regional

Final Four – Philadelphia, PA

See also
1982 AIAW National Division II Basketball Championship
1982 AIAW National Division III Basketball Championship
1982 NCAA Division I women's basketball tournament
1982 NCAA Division II women's basketball tournament
1982 NCAA Division III women's basketball tournament
1982 NAIA women's basketball tournament

References

AIAW women's basketball tournament
AIAW
AIAW National Division I Basketball Championship
1982 in sports in Pennsylvania
Women's sports in Pennsylvania